We Almost Made It is the title of Joseph Arthur's first artbook, released in 2006. It comes with a CD titled The Invisible Parade, a 21-track disc of mostly instrumental songs. Joseph described the set as "an artbook with a soundtrack." Only 5000 copies of the book/disc set were released. The hardcover book contains 110 pages of Joseph's original artwork, marking the first time a collection of his artwork has been made available for publication. The songs "Chapter 4," "Chapter 15," and "Chapter 19" are the only songs on the disc that have lyrics. "Chapter 15" contains lyrics taken from Joseph's poem "On a boat from Ireland to England," and "Chapter 19" contains lyrics from the poem "I saw a nail driven into his hand" (both poems posted on Joseph's website in October 2005). "Chapter 1" and "Chapter 8" also appeared in the documentary film Deliver Us from Evil in 2006 (with "Chapter 1" listed as "Cathedral," and "Chapter 8" listed as "Pyramids"). The book was only available through his website and at his live shows.

CD track listing

Credits
 All songs written, produced, performed, mixed and arranged by Joseph Arthur.
 Additional mixing and production by Matt Boynton, Gary Go and Andreas Wickmann.
 Caroline Glass played: bass clarinet ("Chapter 1," "Chapter 3," "Chapter 10," "Chapter 11," "Chapter 18"), duduk ("Chapter 4"), oboe ("Chapter 10," "Chapter 11," "Chapter 21"), and English horn ("Chapter 16," "Chapter 21").
 Additional drums by Greg Wieczorek (G.Wiz).

External links
"We Almost Made It" official MySpace page

Joseph Arthur albums
2006 albums
2006 books